John Stuart Ellis (born 4 June 1955) is a British theatre and television actor from London, best known for his portrayal of villainous prison officer Jim Fenner in the TV series Bad Girls. He has also appeared in ITV soap Coronation Street as Bookmaker Harry Mason.

He and his former wife Christine Kavanagh, from whom he is now divorced, have two children, Theo and Alice. Theo is the bassist in the Mercury Prize-winning band Wolf Alice. He was educated at Highgate School as were his older brothers Robin Ellis, also an actor, and Peter Ellis, a director.

Biography

Ellis is one of the few performers to have acted prior to Bad Girls, his most prominent TV role being Detective Inspector Muddyman in Prime Suspect. Ellis was also seen in Heartbeat, and has appeared in many TV series, including in The Fugitives (2005), playing the part of Salko; Blue Murder in the episode "Steady Eddie", portraying Dan Fulford; and Highlander: The Series; and in the film Hunter, where he played the lead role.

Ellis is one of the few performers to have acted in both Inspector Morse and its spin-off series Lewis. His first major part since Bad Girls came in summer 2006; Ellis appeared in several episodes of ITV drama Where the Heart Is as businessman Robert Ashford.

In 1994 Ellis played the part of Eddie Barton, a senior HM Customs & Excise Investigation Division officer based at Heathrow Airport who had to retire through ill health caused by motor neurone disease in all seven episodes of series one of The Knock. The disease eventually pushes him into paranoia and death by suicide.

In late 2005 Ellis starred in A Few Good Men at London's Theatre Royal, Haymarket, playing opposite Rob Lowe, John Barrowman and Suranne Jones.

Ellis started his role on Coronation Street as the new Rosamund Street betting shop owner Harry Mason in December 2007. He ran the shop with his son Dan, played by ex-The Bill star Matthew Crompton. Also in 2007, Ellis appeared in an episode of Rome.

Ellis starred in the Theatre Royal, Windsor pantomime Peter Pan (Christmas 2008) playing Captain Hook.

Sam Mendes directed Ellis as Hastings in a William Shakespeare's Richard III starring Kevin Spacey. The show began in June 2011 and toured the world, culminating in a season at the Brooklyn Academy of Music in New York in early 2012.

Later in 2012 he toured in a new production of Dickens' Great Expectations playing Jaggers. The production opened in the West End of London in February 2013 at the Vaudeville Theatre.

In 2014, he starred as Deputy Governor Danforth in the much acclaimed production of The Crucible by Arthur Miller directed by Yael Farber at the Old Vic.Jack has also performed as the King and Le Diable in "Les trois Cheveux d'or du Diable" in Montlaur in French and co devised and co directed " Shakespeare Mon Amour " with Maria Cassi in Florence.

In 2016 Jack starred as Warden Stammas in the theatre production of Stephen King's The Shawshank Redemption, playing alongside Paul Nicholls and Ben Onwukwe.

Filmography

References

External links
 

1955 births
Living people
Male actors from London
People educated at Highgate School
English male television actors
English stage actors
English soap opera actors